John Sam Obuh is a Nigerian football manager. He was most recently the coach of Akwa United F.C. He was in charge of Nigeria's under-17 national team during the 2009 FIFA U-17 World Cup after leaving Kwara United due to a payment dispute. On 20 July 2013 Obuh resigned as Manager of the Nigerian under-20 team. On 29 October 2013 Obuh became the Manager of Enugu Rangers. Obuh was sacked as manager of Enugu Rangers and was replaced by Kelechi Emeteole. Obuh was appointed manager of Kwara United on 16 January 2016. In August 2019, Obuh was appointed Technical adviser and head coach of Akwa United replacing Rafael Everton.

On 16 December 2019, John Obuh renounced his role as the technical adviser of the Nigeria Professional Football League (NPFL), campaigners, Akwa United of Uyo.

Coaching Honors
2009 FIFA U-17 World Cup- Runners-up
2010 WAFU Club Championship- Champion (with Sharks F.C.)

References

Living people
Nigerian football managers
Nigerian footballers
1960 births
Association footballers not categorized by position
Akwa United F.C. managers
Abiola Babes F.C. players